Kurt Abrahams (born 30 December 1996) is a South African professional soccer player who plays as a forward.

Early life
Born in South Africa, Abrahams grew up in Lavender Hill in the Cape Flats of Cape Town.

Club career

Sint-Truidense
Abrahams attended trials with several local clubs in the Cape Town region but was rejected as coaches believed he was too short. He attended a trial with Cape Town United after seeing an advert in a local newspaper at Wynberg Military Camp. The youth team was run by Colin Gie, a noted youth coach in the area, who worked with Abrahams for several years before arranging a trial with Belgian side Sint-Truidense VV when Abrahams was 18. Arriving in July 2015, the club extended the trial period before signing Abrahams on a three-year deal with a two-year extension option for the club.

After progressing through the club's youth system, Abrahams made his senior debut on 1 April 2017 as a substitute in place of Roman Bezus during a 1–0 victory over Waasland-Beveren in a UEFA Europa League playoff match. On 17 May, Abrahams scored his first senior goals after netting a hat-trick during a 7–0 victory over K.V. Mechelen. Having started the match as a substitute, he entered the game in the second half and scored all three goals in an 18-minute period. His performances resulted in the club offering him a three-year contract extension. The following season, Abrahams' involvement in the first team was limited; he made only seven league appearances for the side.

Westerlo
In order to gain more first team experience, Abrahams signed for Belgian First Division B side Westerlo.

Deinze
On 17 July 2021, he joined Deinze on a two-year contract, also in the Belgian First Division B. Abrahams's contract with Deinze was terminated by mutual consent on 12 August 2022.

References 

1996 births
Soccer players from Cape Town
Living people
South African soccer players
Association football forwards
Belgian Pro League players
Challenger Pro League players
Sint-Truidense V.V. players
K.V.C. Westerlo players
K.M.S.K. Deinze players
South African expatriate soccer players
Expatriate footballers in Belgium
South African expatriate sportspeople in Belgium